The 2022–23 Colgate Raiders Men's ice hockey season was the 93rd season of play for the program and the 62nd in the ECAC Hockey conference. The Raiders represented the Colgate University, played their home games at Class of 1965 Arena and were coached by Don Vaughan, in his 30th season as their head coach.

Season

Departures

Recruiting

Roster
As of August 26, 2022.

Standings

Schedule and results

|-
!colspan=12 style=";" | Exhibition

|-
!colspan=12 style=";" | Regular Season

|-
!colspan=12 style=";" | 

|-
!colspan=12 style=";" |

Scoring statistics

Goaltending statistics

Rankings

References

2022-23
Colgate Raiders
Colgate Raiders
Colgate Raiders
Colgate Raiders